Danal Hemananda (born 24 May 2003) is a Sri Lankan cricketer. Who has played for Sri Lanka Under 19 Cricket Team. He made his Twenty20 debut on 6 March 2021, for Police Sports Club in the 2020–21 SLC Twenty20 Tournament.

References

External links
 

2003 births
Living people
Sri Lankan cricketers
Sri Lanka Police Sports Club cricketers